Habia, probably from habe(a), is an element in river names as:
 the Uhabia, a coastal river of the French Basque Country,
 the Ardanabia, a left tributary of the Adour.
It may also be found in names as: Azkabi (Lohitzun), Habiaga (Ainharp, Arrast-Larrebieu, Iholdy), Zehabia (Armendarits), Zehabiaga (Chéraute), Intzabi, Okabe…

The word habia means 'nest' in modern Basque. Its original meaning is 'hole', 'lower place', where rivers flow.

Sources 

Place name element etymologies
Basque toponymy